18610 Arthurdent, provisional designation , is an asteroid from the middle region of the asteroid belt, approximately 3.5 kilometers in diameter. It was discovered on 7 February 1998, by a team of astronomers including Felix Hormuth at Starkenburg Observatory in Heppenheim, Germany. The asteroid was named after Arthur Dent from Douglas Adams's Hitchhiker's Guide to the Galaxy series.

Orbit and classification 

Arthurdent orbits the Sun in the central main-belt at a distance of 2.0–3.1 AU once every 4 years and 1 month (1,485 days). Its orbit has an eccentricity of 0.21 and an inclination of 6° with respect to the ecliptic. The first known precovery image was taken during the Digitized Sky Survey (DSS) at Palomar Observatory in 1988, extending the asteroid's observation arc by 10 years prior to its official discovery observation.

Physical characteristics

Diameter and albedo 

According to the survey carried out by NASA's Wide-field Infrared Survey Explorer with its subsequent NEOWISE mission, Arthurdent measures 3.5 kilometers in diameter and its surface has an albedo of 0.234. This agrees with a generic absolute magnitude-to-diameter conversion for a silicaceous asteroid (albedo of 0.25), which gives a diameter of approximately 3 kilometers for an absolute magnitude of 14.3.

Rotation period 

As of 2017, the Arthurdents composition, rotation period and shape remain unknown.

Naming 

This minor planet was named after Arthur Dent, the bewildered hero of Douglas Adams's radio play and book The Hitchhiker's Guide to the Galaxy. The naming of the asteroid was announced by the Minor Planet Center (MPC) in its Minor Planet Circular on 9 May 2001. Two days later, Adams died of a heart attack in Santa Barbara, California.

Coincidence with death 

The near coincidence of these events led to some media reports of the asteroid naming appearing after Adams's death was reported, and to assumptions that the two events occurred on the same day, even by those connected to the naming: on 14 May 2001, German amateur astronomer Reiner Stoss at the Starkenburg Observatory wrote: "You may have heard the sad news that Douglas Adams passed away last Friday. By accident on the same day the naming of minor planet (18610) Arthurdent was announced by the Minor Planet Center. We wanted to make Mr. Adams a joy, but did never dare to think that he wouldn't be able to receive this surprise, when we sent our name proposal to the MPC a few months back."

References

External links 
 Asteroid Lightcurve Database (LCDB), query form (info )
 Dictionary of Minor Planet Names, Google books
 Asteroids and comets rotation curves, CdR – Observatoire de Genève, Raoul Behrend
 Discovery Circumstances: Numbered Minor Planets (15001)-(20000) – Minor Planet Center
 
 

018610
018610
Named minor planets
18610 Arthurdent
19980207